Nuculana acuta, or the pointed nut clam, is a marine bivalve mollusc in the family Nuculanidae. It can be found along the Atlantic coast of North America, ranging from Massachusetts to Texas, including the West Indies.

References

Nuculanidae
Bivalves described in 1831